Manlio De Angelis (January 9, 1935 – July 3, 2017) was an Italian actor and voice actor.

Biography
Born in Rome to historic dubber Gualtiero De Angelis, De Angelis began his career as an actor in the early 1960s. He most notably portrayed a Russian General in the 1968 film Fantabulous Inc..

De Angelis was more prolific as a voice actor and dubber. He was best known for dubbing over the voices of Alan Arkin, Richard Dreyfuss and Joe Pesci into the Italian language. He also dubbed over the voice of Martin Brody (portrayed by Roy Scheider) in the Jaws film series as well as David Starsky (portrayed by Paul Michael Glaser) in Starsky & Hutch. His animation roles include voicing Friar Tuck in the Italian version of the 1973 Disney film Robin Hood as well as Yosemite Sam in the Italian version of Who Framed Roger Rabbit.

Personal life
De Angelis was the father of voice actors Vittorio and Eleonora De Angelis. His older brother Enrico De Angelis was a former member of Quartetto Cetra.

Death
De Angelis died in Porto Rotondo within the province of Olbia on 3 July 2017, at the age of 82. His son Vittorio De Angelis died of a heart attack two years prior.

Filmography

Cinema
 Un branco di vigliacchi (1962)
 Fantabulous Inc. (1968)

Dubbing roles

Animation
Friar Tuck in Robin Hood
Saddam Hussein in South Park: Bigger, Longer & Uncut 
Pete Belinksy in American Pop
Lrrr in Futurama (seasons 6–7)
Iwaki in The Orphan Brothers
Yosemite Sam in Who Framed Roger Rabbit

Live action

References

External links 
 
 
 

1935 births
2017 deaths
Male actors from Rome
Italian male voice actors
Italian male film actors
Italian male television actors
20th-century Italian male actors
21st-century Italian male actors
Italian voice directors